The 21st Annual South African Music Awards were announced during a gala event at Sun City's Super Bowl arena in the North West province on Sunday night, 19 April 2015. It was branded as #SAMAXXI, where XXI represents the Roman numerals for 21.

Winners and nominees
Cassper Nyovest had five nominations for SAMA awards but only walked away with Newcomer of the Year. K.O. beat him to the Best Rap Album of the Year and AKA took Male Artist of the Year. Beatenberg secured 3 SAMAs out of 5 nominations. The group went to win four Special Awards during the pre-show for their collaboration with DJ Clock.

Awards

Special Awards

 International Achievement Award
 Wouter Kellerman – The world-renowned flautist received the award for his Grammy-winning album, Winds of Samsara.

 Lifetime Achievement Awards
 M'du Masilela
 Mandla Mofokeng
 Zim Ngqawana

 SAMPRA Award (Highest Airplay of the Year)
 "Pluto" – DJ Clock featuring Beatenberg

Mobile Music Awards

 Best Selling Album
 Die Regte Tyd – Riana Nel

 Best Selling DVD
 Vol. 18 One Purpose – Joyous SA

 Best Selling Mobile Music Download
 "Pluto" – DJ Clock featuring Beatenberg

 Best Selling Ring-Back Tone
 "Pluto" – DJ Clock featuring Beatenberg

 Best Selling Full-Track Download
 "Pluto" – DJ Clock featuring Beatenberg

References

South African Music Awards
South African Music Awards
South African Music Awards
South African Music Awards